Blokhin might refer to one of the following:
People
 Alexander Viktorovich Blokhin (born 1951), Russian diplomat
 Iryna Blokhina (born 1983), Ukrainian singer and poet, daughter of Oleh Blokhin
 Nikolai Nikolaevich Blokhin (1912 -  1993),   Soviet surgeon and oncologist
 Oleh Blokhin (born 1952), Ukrainian football coach
 Oleh Olehovych Blokhin (born 1980), Ukrainian football player
 Tatyana Blokhina (born 1970), Russian heptathlete
 Vasili Blokhin (1895–1955), chief executioner during Stalin's purges
 Yevgeniy Blokhin (born 1979), Kazakh ice hockey player
Places
Blokhin Peak, Chukotka, Russia

Russian-language surnames